Grove is an English, Scottish, and Anglo-Norman surname, which came from the Norman French Le Groux, a name for someone who lived by a grove or thicket. Notable people with the surname include:

 Alex Grove (born 1987), Scottish rugby union player
 Amanda Grove, American Court TV personality
 Andrew Grove (1936–2016), Hungarian-born American engineer and businessman; former CEO of Intel
 Archibald Grove (1855–1920), British magazine editor
 Betty Ann Grove, American actress
 Charles Clayton Grove, American mathematician
 Charlotte Grove (1773–1860), British diarist
 David Grove (born 1935), American archaeologist, academic and Mesoamericanist scholar
 Dick Grove (1927-1998), American musician, composer and educator
 Edwin Wiley Grove, American druggist and millionaire
 Eleanor Grove (1826-1905), British educationist
 Elliot Grove, Canadian-born film producer
 Emily Grove (athlete) (born 1993), American pole vaulter
 Emily Grove (singer) (born 1991), American singer
 Eric Grove (1948–2021), British naval historian and defence analyst
 Frederick Philip Grove alias Felix Paul Greve, German-Canadian author
 George Grove (1820–1900), British engineer and writer on music, known for Grove's Dictionary of Music and Musicians
 Jake Grove, American football offensive lineman
 John L. Grove, American industrialist
 Joseph Grove (1699–1764), English biographer
 Justin Grove (born 1988), American soccer player
 Kathy Grove (born 1948), American photographer
 Kendall Grove, American mixed martial arts fighter
 Kenneth Grove (born 1953), Australian driver
 Lefty Grove (1900–1975), American baseball pitcher
 Logan Grove (born 1998), American actor and voice actor
 Marmaduke Grove (1878–1954), Chilean air force officer and politician, founder of the Socialist Party of Chile
 Marilyn Judith Grove (1941–1997), New Zealand cartoonist better known as Kim Casali
 Michael Grove (born 1996), American baseball player
 Neil Grove (born 1971), South African-English mixed martial artist
 Noah Grove (born 1999), American ice sled hockey player
 Patrick Grove (born 1975), Australian internet and media entrepreneur in Asia
 Rupert Grove (1906–1982), Australian solicitor
 Shannon Grove (born 1965), American politician from California
 Steven Eugene Grove "Euge Groove" (born 1962), American saxophonist
 William Robert Grove (1811–1896), Welsh judge and physical scientist

See also
 De Graaf, a surname
 Graves (surname)
 Grove (disambiguation)
 Grover (surname)